Jessica Davis (born April 10, 1978, Greenbrae, California) is an American rhythmic gymnast.

Davis competed for the United States in the rhythmic gymnastics individual all-around competition at the 1996 Summer Olympics in Atlanta. There she was 30th in the qualification round and did not advance to the semifinal.

References

External links 
 
 
 Jessica Davis' official biography at the USA Gymnastics website

1978 births
Living people
American rhythmic gymnasts
Gymnasts at the 1996 Summer Olympics
Olympic gymnasts of the United States
Sportspeople from California
Pan American Games medalists in gymnastics
Pan American Games gold medalists for the United States
Pan American Games silver medalists for the United States
Pan American Games bronze medalists for the United States
Gymnasts at the 1995 Pan American Games
Medalists at the 1995 Pan American Games
21st-century American women